Cheyenne is an American Western television series of 108 black-and-white episodes broadcast on ABC from 1955 to 1962. The show was the first hour-long Western, and was the first hour-long dramatic series of any kind, with continuing characters, to last more than one season. It was also the first series to be made by a major Hollywood film studio which did not derive from its established film properties, and the first of a long chain of Warner Bros. original series produced by William T. Orr.

Synopsis
The show starred Clint Walker, a native of Illinois, as Cheyenne Bodie, a physically large cowboy with a gentle spirit in search of frontier justice who wanders the American West in the days after the American Civil War. The first episode, "Mountain Fortress", is about robbers pretending to be Good Samaritans. It features James Garner (who had briefly been considered for the role of Cheyenne but could not be located until after Walker had already been cast) as a guest star, but with higher billing given to Ann Robinson as Garner's intended bride. The episode reveals that Bodie's parents were killed by Indians, tribe unknown. He was taken by Cheyenne Indians when he was an infant but left to be raised by a white family when he was 12. (One episode, 'West of the River' is inconsistent and states that he was taken when he was taken and then raised by the Cheyenne when he was 10 years old, and he left them by choice when he was 18 years old.) In the series, the character Bodie maintains a positive and understanding attitude toward the Native Americans, despite the death of his parents.

In Season 5, Episode 1 "The Long Rope", which originally aired on September 26, 1960, Cheyenne returns to the town where he was raised by a family (the Pierces) whose father/husband Jeff was lynched when he, Cheyenne, was a youth. This causes some confusion with the viewer as it was said that Cheyenne was raised by a Cheyenne tribe after unknown Indians had killed his parents, but the various accounts say that he left the tribe at 12 or 18.

Cast

Main cast
 Clint Walker as Cheyenne Bodie (107 episodes)
L.Q. Jones appeared as "Smitty" Smith in episodes 1, 2 and 4 but other than that there were no other continuing characters, although several actors were frequently used in guest or bit roles. Clyde Howdy appeared as a variety of characters in 49 episodes; Chuck Hicks can be seen playing assorted characters in 15 episodes; and Lane Chandler appears as different characters in 10 episodes.

Production

Development
The series began as a part of Warner Bros. Presents, a "wheel program" that alternated three different series in rotation. In its first year, Cheyenne traded broadcast weeks with Casablanca and Kings Row. Thereafter, Cheyenne was overhauled by new producer Roy Huggins and left the umbrella of that wheel.

Cheyenne ran from 1955 to 1963, except for a hiatus when Walker went on strike for better terms (1958–1959); among other demands, the actor wanted increased residuals, a reduction of the 50% cut of personal appearance payments that had to be turned over to Warner Bros., and a release from the restriction of recording music only for the company's own label.

The interim had the introduction of a virtual Bodie-clone called Bronco Layne, played by Ty Hardin, born in New York City, but raised in Texas. Hardin was featured as the quasi main character during Bodie's absence. When Warner Bros. renegotiated Walker's contract and the actor returned to the show in 1959, Bronco was spun off.

Even after returning to the program — having been prohibited from seeking other work during the long contract negotiation — Walker was unhappy to continue to play a role which he felt he had already exhausted. He told reporters that he felt like "a caged animal."

Episodes

Release

Broadcast 

Cheyenne aired on ABC from 1955 to 1963: September 1955-September 1959 on Tuesday at 7:30-8:30 pm; September 1959-December 1962, Monday 7:30-8:30 pm; and April 1963-September 1963, Friday 7:30-8:30 pm. The series finished at number 13 in the Nielsen ratings for the 1957-1958 season, number 18 for 1958-1959, number 17 for 1959-1960, and number 28 for 1960-1961.

Home media 
Warner Home Video released a "Best of..." single disc featuring three individual episodes (from three separate seasons) on September 27, 2005, as part of their "Television Favorites" compilation series. The featured episodes were "The Storm Riders" (from season one), "The Trap" (from season two) and "The Young Fugitives" (from season six).

Warner Home Video has released the first season on DVD in Region 1. Seasons 2-7 have been released via their Warner Archive Collection.  These are manufacture-on-demand  releases on DVD-R discs.  The seventh and final season was released on November 12, 2013.

Reception

 Cheyenne was a co-winner of the 1957 Golden Globe Award for Television Achievement.
 1957: Emmy nomination for Robert Watts (Best Editing of a Film for Television)

Spin-offs and crossovers

For most of their runs, Cheyenne, Bronco, and Sugarfoot, starring Will Hutchins, alternated in the same time slot. Cheyenne was the senior partner of the three. Only a snippet of the Bronco theme song was heard at the closing of the opening credits, as a kind of aural footnote to that of Cheyenne.

At the conclusion of the sixth season, a special episode was aired, "A Man Named Ragan", the pilot for a program  called The Dakotas, starring Larry Ward, Chad Everett, Jack Elam, and Michael Greene, that was to have replaced Cheyenne in the middle of the next season. However, because Cheyenne Bodie never appeared in "Ragan", the two programs are only tenuously linked.

Walker reprised the Cheyenne Bodie character in 1991 for the TV movie The Gambler Returns: The Luck of the Draw, which featured numerous actors from earlier television series playing their original roles (Jack Kelly, Brian Keith, Gene Barry, Hugh O'Brien, Chuck Connors, David Carradine etc.) and also portrayed Cheyenne in a time travel episode of Kung Fu: The Legend Continues called "Gunfighters" in 1995.

References

External links

 

1950s Western (genre) television series
1960s Western (genre) television series
American Broadcasting Company original programming
1955 American television series debuts
1962 American television series endings
Dell Comics titles
Television series by Warner Bros. Television Studios
Television shows set in Wyoming
Black-and-white American television shows
English-language television shows
Cultural depictions of Sitting Bull
Cultural depictions of George Armstrong Custer